Battle of the Titans may refer to

The Titanomachy of Greek mythology
The 1970 24 Hours of Le Mans race

See also
Battle of the Giants (disambiguation)
Clash of the Titans (disambiguation)